Mam'zelle Champagne was a musical revue with book by Edgar Allan Woolf, music by Cassius Freeborn, produced by Henry Pincus, which opened June 25, 1906. On opening night at the outdoor Madison Square Garden Roof Theatre, millionaire playboy Harry K. Thaw shot and killed architect Stanford White: the otherwise undistinguished musical's run continued for some 60 performances largely on the publicity from this incident.

The play
Directed by Lionel Lawrence, Mamzelle Champagne was Maude Fulton’s Broadway debut. Viola de Costa, Eddie Fowler, Harry Short and Arthur Stanford were also in the cast. When the show was revived for four performances at the Berkeley Lyceum Theatre in October 1906, the cast included May Yohe and Robert Emmett O'Connor.

Theater critic and historian Burns Mantle cited a letter he received from Woolf saying “Mamzelle Champagne was my Columbia [University] Varsity Show, and was transported by a manager, Henry Pincus, to the open Madison Square Roof with a professional cast.” However, The Varsity Show’s own website disputes this “legend”, saying Mam’zelle was Woolf's first professional show and not the one he had written as a student in the class of 1901.

The murder
Stanford White was known to have seduced Thaw's wife, showgirl Evelyn Nesbit. During the opening-night performance of Mam'zelle Champagne, audience members noticed Thaw repeatedly glaring at White. Thaw eventually got up, crossed over to White's seat and shot him point-blank while the show onstage was in the midst of a number titled "I Could Love a Million Girls". It has never been established whether the subject matter of this particular song was a factor in prompting Thaw to take action at that particular moment.

The murder is central to the plot of E.L. Doctorow's 1975 historical novel Ragtime, and in the 1981 movie veteran actor Donald O'Connor sings "I Could Love a Million Girls". The song "I Could Love a Million Girls" is also featured in The Simpsons episode 7G10: "Homer's Night Out".

Footnotes

Bibliography
 Baatz, Simon, The Girl on the Velvet Swing: Sex, Murder, and Madness at the Dawn of the Twentieth Century (New York: Little, Brown, 2018) 
“Mamzelle Champagne”, Internet Broadway Database (ibdb.com)
Mantle, Burns, and Garrison P. Sherwood, eds., The Best Plays of 1899-1909, (Philadelphia: The Blakiston Company), 1944.
“The Stage and Its Players: This Week's Offerings,” New York Times, Jun. 24, 1906, p. X6.
“Thaw Murders Stanford White. Shoots Him on the Madison Square Garden Roof.  About Evelyn Nesbit. “He Ruined My Life”, Witness Says He Said. Audience in a Panic. Chairs and Tables are Overturned in a Wild Scramble for the Exits,” New York Times, Jun. 26, 1906, p. 1.
The Varsity Show Website

1906 musicals
Revues